Quality Street: A Seasonal Selection for All the Family is a studio album by British singer-songwriter Nick Lowe. The album was released on October 29, 2013 by Yep Roc Records. The album was featured at #17 on Rolling Stone's "40 Essential Christmas Albums" list on November 30, 2019.

Album Background and Recording 
Quality Street  was released following Lowe's 2011 studio album, The Old Magic.

Nick Lowe was approached by his label, Yep Roc Records, to make a Christmas themed album. Lowe's initial reaction was negative, but he later agreed to take on the project, as he said in an interview with The Current radio station on December 20, 2013.

The album was recorded at Gravity Shack Studios in Tooting Bec, London, UK. This studio has since been renamed as Silver Shark Studios. While recording in the studios Lowe said, "We tried to make it a sleigh-bell free atmosphere."

Quality Street features three Nick Lowe originals: "Christmas at the Airport", "I Was Born in Bethlehem" and "A Dollar Short of Happy." Lowe also covers Roger Miller's "Old Toy Trains" and Wizzard's "I Wish It Could Be Christmas Everyday." "Hooves on the Roof" was composed by Ron Sexsmith expressly for this album.

As a promotional event by Yep Roc, Quality Street was streamed in its entirety for 24 hours on YouTube on July 25, 2013.

Critical Reception 
In a review for AllMusic, Stephen Thomas Erlewine said, "Easing into his second decade as a dapper crooner, it's little wonder that Nick Lowe has succumbed to the siren call that seduces every gentleman vocalist: he's gone and made a Christmas album."

The Washington Post covered the album in an article posted on November 29, 2013. Chris Klimek began the article with, "In the A.D. era of Christmas albums — that would be After Dylan — nobody who releases one can seem too dark a horse. Still, Nick Lowe, who called his first solo album “Jesus of Cool” (it was retitled in these more sensitive United States), isn't the likeliest candidate."

On December 8, 2013 Lowe performed "Christmas at the Airport" during an interview for NPR.

Quality Street was given 4 out of 5 stars by the London-based publication, Uncut, on December 17, 2013. Luke Torn began his review with, "Ol’ Saint Nick, playful pop alchemy, and the retro-reinvention of the Christmas album..."

Quality Street was named Album of the Week by The Independent on December 21, 2013. Andy Gill began the article with, "With Quality Street, Nick Lowe manages the virtually impossible, delivering a Christmas album that's both inventive and irony-free, and seasonally warm without pushing any of the usual commercial buttons."

Track listing

Personnel 

 Nick Lowe - lead vocals, acoustic guitar, producer  
 Geraint Watkins - keyboards
 Johnny Scott - guitar 
 Matt Radford - bass 
 Robert Treherne - drums, producer  
Technical
 Peta Waddington - design 
 Rose Blake - illustration 
 Tim Young - vinyl mastering 
 Dan Burn-Forti - photography 
 Neil Brockbank - producer, recording 
 Tucker Nelson - recording

References

External links
 

2013 albums
2013 Christmas albums
Nick Lowe albums
Christmas albums by English artists
Yep Roc Records albums